Marin Ljubičić (born 15 June 1988) is a Croatian footballer who plays as a defensive midfielder for NK Dugopolje.

Club career
Ljubičić started playing football at his local club ONK Metković, shortly moving on to NK Neretva, before joining the HNK Hajduk Split academy. Becoming professional for the club, he played in top-tier 31 match before moving on to NK Zadar in the summer of 2008. After a season and a half, Ljubičić rejoined Hajduk, featuring in further 29 league matches for the club before being transferred to the Ukrainian side SC Tavriya Simferopol in the summer of 2011, for the sum of 400 thousand Euros.

After three years in Tavriya, in the summer of 2014, Ljubičić joined the Hungarian side Puskás Akadémia FC. After 4 months at the club, without a single game for the first team, Ljubičić moved on to Slovakia, signing for DAC Dunajská Streda.

After three years at the club, having played in 100 games for DAC, Ljubičić joined their rivals Slovan Bratislava in August 2018.

After further stints in Senica and Sereď, Ljubičić returned to Croatia, signing for second-tier NK Dugopolje in the summer of 2022.

Honours
Slovan Bratislava
Fortuna Liga: 2018–19, 2019–20
Slovnaft Cup: 2019–20

References

External links

1988 births
Living people
Sportspeople from Metković
Association football midfielders
Croatian footballers
Croatia youth international footballers
Croatia under-21 international footballers
HNK Hajduk Split players
NK Zadar players
SC Tavriya Simferopol players
FC DAC 1904 Dunajská Streda players
ŠK Slovan Bratislava players
FK Senica players
ŠKF Sereď players
NK Dugopolje players
Croatian Football League players
Ukrainian Premier League players
Slovak Super Liga players
First Football League (Croatia) players
Croatian expatriate footballers
Expatriate footballers in Ukraine
Croatian expatriate sportspeople in Ukraine
Expatriate footballers in Slovakia
Croatian expatriate sportspeople in Slovakia